This article shows the 14-player roster of all participating teams at the 2022 FIVB Volleyball Women's World Championship.

Pool A

The following is Belgium's roster for the 2022 FIVB Volleyball Women's World Championship.

Head Coach:  Gert Vande Broek

2 Elise Van Sas 
3 Britt Herbots 
4 Nathalie Lemmens 
5 Jodie Guilliams 
7 Celine Van Gestel 
9 Nel Demeyer 
10 Pauline Martin 
12 Charlotte Krenicky 
13 Marlies Janssens 
15 Jutta Van de Vyver 
18 Britt Rampelberg 
19 Silke Van Avermaet 
21 Manon Stragier 
22 Anna Koulberg

The following is Cameroon's roster for the 2022 FIVB Volleyball Women's World Championship.

Head Coach:  Jean-René Akono

1 Baran Kuong Sourea 
2 Bediang Mpon Rodrigue 
3 Magalie Mbengono Mengue 
5 Paule Arielle Olomo 
7 Reine Ngameni Mbopda Davina 
8 Emmanuela Grâce Bikatal 
9 Brandy Gatcheu Djeutchoko 
10 Simone Flore Bikatal 
12 Carine Blamdai 
13 Michelle Wete Sissako 
14 Yolande Amana Guigolo 
15 Emelda Piata Zessi 
16 Estelle Adiana 
18 Oceane Guebon Abouem

The following is Italy's roster for the 2022 FIVB Volleyball Women's World Championship.

Head Coach:  Davide Mazzanti

1 Marina Lubian 
3 Alessia Gennari 
4 Sara Bonifacio 
5 Ofelia Malinov 
6 Monica De Gennaro 
7 Eleonora Fersino 
8 Alessia Orro 
9 Caterina Bosetti 
10 Cristina Chirichella 
11 Anna Danesi 
14 Elena Pietrini 
15 Sylvia Nwakalor 
17 Miriam Sylla 
18 Paola Egonu

The following is Kenya's roster for the 2022 FIVB Volleyball Women's World Championship.

Head Coach:  Luizomar de Moura

1 Veronica Kilabat 
2 Veronica Adhiambo Oluoch 
3 Violet Makuto 
5 Sharon Chepchumba 
6 Belinda Barasa 
7 Emmaculate Nekesa 
10 Noel Murambi 
12 Gladys Ekaru 
13 Yvonne Wavinya 
14 Mercy Moim 
15 Lorine Chebet 
16 Agripina Kundu 
19 Edith Mukuvilani 
20 Sande Meldinah Nemali

The following is Netherlands's roster for the 2022 FIVB Volleyball Women's World Championship.

Head Coach:  Avital Selinger

2 Fleur Savelkoel 
4 Celeste Plak 
5 Jolien Knollema 
7 Juliet Lohuis 
9 Myrthe Schoot 
11 Anne Buijs 
12 Britt Bongaerts 
14 Laura Dijkema 
18 Marrit Jasper 
19 Nika Daalderop 
20 Tessa Polder 
23 Eline Timmerman 
25 Florien Reesink 
26 Elles Dambrink

The following is Puerto Rico's roster for the 2022 FIVB Volleyball Women's World Championship.

Head Coach:  Fernando Morales

2 Shara Venegas 
4 Raymariely Santos 
7 Stephanie Enright 
8 Paola Rojas 
9 Jennifer Nogueras 
10 Diana Reyes 
11 Brittany Abercrombie 
12 Neira Ortiz 
14 Natalia Valentín 
15 Génesis Collazo 
16 Alba Hernández 
21 Pilar Marie Victoria 
22 Karina Ocasio 
23 Nomaris Vélez

Pool B

The following is Croatia's roster for the 2022 FIVB Volleyball Women's World Championship.

Head Coach:  Ferhat Akbas

2 Mika Grbavica 
3 Ema Strunjak 
4 Božana Butigan 
6 Klara Perić 
7 Laura Miloš 
9 Lucija Mlinar 
10 Dijana Karatović 
11 Beta Dumančić 
12 Josipa Marković 
13 Samanta Fabris 
14 Martina Šamadan 
16 Lea Deak 
19 Izabela Štimac 
20 Natalia Tomić

The following is Dominican Republic's roster for the 2022 FIVB Volleyball Women's World Championship.

Head Coach:  Marcos Kwiek

2 Yaneirys Rodríguez 
5 Brenda Castillo 
6 Camil Domínguez 
7 Niverka Marte 
8 Cándida Arias 
9 Angélica Hinojosa 
15 Madeline Guillén 
16 Yonkaira Peña 
18 Bethania de la Cruz 
20 Brayelin Martínez 
21 Jineiry Martínez 
23 Gaila González 
24 Geraldine González 
25 Larysmer Martínez

The following is Poland's roster for the 2022 FIVB Volleyball Women's World Championship.

Head Coach:  Stefano Lavarini

1 Maria Stenzel 
2 Anna Obiała 
3 Klaudia Alagierska 
5 Agnieszka Kąkolewska 
6 Kamila Witkowska 
7 Monika Galkowska 
8 Zuzanna Górecka 
9 Magdalena Stysiak 
10 Monika Fedusio 
12 Aleksandra Szczygłowska 
14 Joanna Wołosz 
22 Weronika Szlagowska 
26 Katarzyna Wenerska 
30 Olivia Różański

The following is South Korea's roster for the 2022 FIVB Volleyball Women's World Championship.

Head Coach:  Cesar Hernández González

1 Han Soo-ji 
3 Yeum Hye-seon 
4 Han Da-hye 
5 Kim Ha Kyung 
8 Kim Yeong-yeon 
9 Lee Ju-Ah 
11 Park Hye-min 
12 Lee Da-hyeon 
13 Park Jeong-ah 
15 Lee Seon-woo 
17 Ha Hye-jin 
18 Hwang Min-kyoung 
19 Pyo Seung-ju 
20 Yoo Seo-yeun

The following is Thailand's roster for the 2022 FIVB Volleyball Women's World Championship.

Head Coach:  Danai Sriwatcharamethakul

2 Piyanut Pannoy 
3 Pornpun Guedpard 
5 Thatdao Nuekjang 
9 Nuttaporn Sanitklang 
11 Khatthalee Pinsuwan 
12 Hattaya Bamrungsuk 
13 Natthanicha Jaisaen 
14 Thanacha Sooksod 
16 Pimpichaya Kokram 
17 Sasipapron Janthawisut 
18 Ajcharaporn Kongyot 
19 Chatchu-On Moksri 
22 Watchareeya Nuanjam 
24 Tichakorn Boonlert

The following is Turkey's roster for the 2022 FIVB Volleyball Women's World Championship.

Head Coach:  Giovanni Guidetti

2 Simge Şebnem Aköz 
3 Cansu Özbay 
6 Saliha Şahin 
7 Hande Baladın 
9 Meliha İsmailoğlu 
12 Elif Şahin 
13 Meryem Boz 
14 Eda Erdem Dündar 
15 Ayçin Akyol 
17 Derya Cebecioğlu 
18 Zehra Güneş 
20 Aylin Sarıoğlu 
22 İlkin Aydın 
99 Ebrar Karakurt

Pool C

The following is Bulgaria's roster for the 2022 FIVB Volleyball Women's World Championship.

Head Coach:  Lorenzo Micelli

1 Gergana Dimitrova 
2 Nasya Dimitrova 
4 Elena Becheva 
5 Maria Yordanova 
6 Miroslava Paskova 
7 Lora Kitipova 
8 Petya Barakova 
9 Borislava Saykova 
10 Mira Todorova 
13 Mila Pashkuleva 
16 Elitsa Atanasijević 
17 Radostina Marinova 
18 Silvana Chausheva 
28 Mariya Krivoshiyska

The following is Canada's roster for the 2022 FIVB Volleyball Women's World Championship.

Head Coach:  Shannon Winzer

3 Kiera Van Ryk 
4 Vicky Savard 
5 Julia Murmann 
6 Jazmine Ruth White 
8 Alicia Ogoms 
9 Alexa Gray 
11 Andrea Mitrović 
12 Jennifer Cross 
13 Brie King 
14 Hilary Howe 
16 Caroline Livingston 
18 Kim Robitaille 
19 Emily Maglio 
20 Arielle Palermo

The following is Germany's roster for the 2022 FIVB Volleyball Women's World Championship.

Head Coach:  Vital Heynen

2 Pia Kästner 
4 Anna Pogany 
5 Corina Glaab 
6 Jennifer Janiska 
8 Kimberly Drewniok 
9 Lina Alsmeier 
10 Lena Stigrot 
12 Hanna Orthmann 
13 Saskia Hippe 
14 Marie Schölzel 
15 Elisa Lohmann 
17 Laura Emonts 
21 Camilla Weitzel 
22 Monique Strubbe

The following is Kazakhstan's roster for the 2022 FIVB Volleyball Women's World Championship.

Head Coach:  Darko Dobreskov

3 Yana Petrenko 
4 Ekaterina Mikhailova 
9 Valeriya Chumak 
11 Yelizaveta Meister 
12 Sabira Bekisheva 
15 Madina Beket 
16 Tatyana Nikitina 
17 Margarita Belchenko 
19 Anastassiya Kolomoyets 
21 Tomiris Sagimbayeva 
25 Nailya Nigmatulina 
27 Natalya Smirnova 
29 Kristina Belova 
99 Dinara Kozhanberdina

The following is Serbia's roster for the 2022 FIVB Volleyball Women's World Championship.

Head Coach:  Daniele Santarelli

1 Bianka Buša 
2 Katarina Lazović 
4 Bojana Drča 
5 Mina Popović 
8 Slađana Mirković 
9 Brankica Mihajlović 
12 Teodora Pušić 
13 Ana Bjelica 
14 Maja Aleksić 
15 Jovana Stevanović 
16 Aleksandra Jegdić 
18 Tijana Bošković 
19 Bojana Milenković 
22 Sara Lozo

The following is United States' roster for the 2022 FIVB Volleyball Women's World Championship.

Head Coach:  Karch Kiraly

2 Jordyn Poulter 
4 Justine Wong-Orantes 
5 Morgan Hentz 
7 Lauren Carlini 
8 Hannah Tapp 
11 Annie Drews 
13 Sarah Wilhite Parsons 
15 Haleigh Washington 
18 Kara Bajema 
20 Danielle Cuttino 
23 Kelsey Robinson 
24 Chiaka Ogbogu 
30 Ali Frantti 
31 Anna Hall

Pool D

The following is Argentina's roster for the 2022 FIVB Volleyball Women's World Championship.

Head Coach:  Hernán Ferraro

2 Sabrina Germanier 
3 Paula Nizetich 
4 Daniela Simian Bulaich 
5 Candelaria Salinas 
6 Lucia Verdier 
7 Erika Mercado 
9 Bianca Cugno 
10 Emilce Sosa 
12 Tatiana Rizzo 
13 Bianca Farriol 
14 Victoria Mayer 
17 Candelaria Herrera 
19 Brenda Graff 
20 Agostina Pelozo

The following is Brazil's roster for the 2022 FIVB Volleyball Women's World Championship.

Head Coach:  José Roberto Guimarães

2 Carol Gattaz 
3 Júlia Kudiess 
4 Ana Carolina da Silva 
5 Priscila Daroit 
6 Nyeme Costa 
7 Rosamaria Montibeller 
8 Macris Carneiro 
9 Roberta Ratzke 
10 Gabriela Guimarães 
14 Natália Araujo 
15 Lorena Viezel 
16 Kisy Nascimento 
19 Tainara Santos 
24 Lorenne Teixeira

The following is China's roster for the 2022 FIVB Volleyball Women's World Championship.

Head Coach:  Cai Bin

1 Yuan Xinyue 
3 Diao Linyu 
4 Yang Hanyu 
5 Gao Yi 
6 Gong Xiangyu 
7 Wang Yuanyuan 
8 Jin Ye 
10 Wang Yunlu 
11 Wang Yizhu 
12 Li Yingying 
15 Wang Weiyi 
16 Ding Xia 
18 Wang Mengjie 
19 Chen Peiyan

The following is Colombia's roster for the 2022 FIVB Volleyball Women's World Championship.

Head Coach:  Antonio Rizola

1 Darlevis Mosquera 
2 Yeisy Soto 
3 Dayana Segovia 
5 Ana Karina Olaya 
6 Valerin Carabalí 
7 Madelaynne Montaño 
9 Laura Pascua 
10 Juliana Toro 
13 Camila Gómez 
14 Angie Velásquez 
15 María Alejandra Marín 
16 Melissa Rangel 
19 María Margarita Martínez 
20 Amanda Coneo

The following is Czech Republic's roster for the 2022 FIVB Volleyball Women's World Championship.

Head Coach:  Giannis Athanasopoulos

1 Andrea Kossányiová 
2 Eva Hodanová 
4 Gabriela Orvošová 
8 Ela Koulisiani 
9 Daniela Digrinová 
10 Kateřina Valková 
11 Veronika Dostálová 
13 Denisa Pavlíková 
16 Michaela Mlejnková 
17 Klára Faltínová 
18 Pavlina Šimáňová 
19 Petra Kojdová 
23 Simona Bajusz 
26 Lucie Blazková

The following is Japan's roster for the 2022 FIVB Volleyball Women's World Championship.

Head Coach:  Masayoshi Manabe

2 Mami Uchiseto 
3 Sarina Koga 
4 Mayu Ishikawa 
5 Haruyo Shimamura 
10 Arisa Inoue 
12 Aki Momii 
15 Kotona Hayashi 
19 Nichika Yamada 
22 Satomi Fukudome 
23 Mami Yotoka 
26 Airi Miyabe 
30 Nanami Seki 
37 Ameze Miyabe 
38 Yoshino Sato

See also

 2022 FIVB Volleyball Men's World Championship squads

References

External links
Teams

S
FIVB Volleyball Women's World Championship squads